GGI may refer to:

 Galileo Galilei Institute for Theoretical Physics, near Florence, Italy
 General Glass Industries, a defunct American glassmaker
 General Graphics Interface
 Global Governance Institute, a Belgian think tank
 Grinnell Regional Airport, in Iowa, United States
 Gullah Gullah Island, an American television series